Nationality words link to articles with information on the nation's poetry or literature (for instance, Irish or France).

Events

Works published
 Timanna, Parijatapahanannamu, Indian, Telugu-language narrative poem
 Thomas Murner, Geuchmat ("Meadow of Fools"), a verse satire; Germany

Births
Death years link to the corresponding "[year] in poetry" article:
 Gutierre de Cetina (died 1554), Spanish poet and soldier
 Nicholas Grimald, birth year uncertain (died 1562), English poet and translator

Deaths
Birth years link to the corresponding "[year] in poetry" article:
 Habibi, possible date (born c. 1470), Azerbaijani poet
 Ferceirtne Ó Curnín (born unknown), Irish poet 
 Domhnall Glas Ó Curnín (born unknown), Irish poet

See also

 Poetry
 16th century in poetry
 16th century in literature
 French Renaissance literature
 Grands Rhétoriqueurs
 Renaissance literature
 Spanish Renaissance literature

Notes

16th-century poetry
Poetry